Željko Gavrić (born 5 December 2000) is a Serbian professional footballer who plays as a winger for FC DAC 1904 Dunajská Streda, on loan from Ferencvárosi TC.

Club career

Red Star Belgrade
On 15 August 2018, Gavrić was loaned to Red Star's feeder team, Grafičar. On 29 September 2019, he scored his first hat trick as a professional in a 4–2 victory against Dinamo Vranje in the Serbian First League. On 13 November 2019, he extended his contract with Red Star to the summer of 2023.

Ferencváros
On 12 August 2021, Gavrić completed a move to Hungarian champions Ferencvárosi for estimated fee of €1.2 million. He signed four-year contract with the club.

International career
Gavrić made his debut for Serbia national team on 7 June 2021 in a friendly against Jamaica.

Career statistics

Club

International

Honours
Grafičar Beograd
 Serbian League Belgrade: 2018–19

Red Star Belgrade
 Serbian SuperLiga: 2019–20, 2020–21
 Serbian Cup: 2020–21

Ferencvárosi TC
 Nemzeti Bajnokság I: 2021-22
 Magyar Kupa: 2021-22

References

External links
 
 
 

2000 births
Living people
People from Ugljevik
Serbs of Bosnia and Herzegovina
Association football wingers
Serbian footballers
Serbia international footballers
Serbia under-21 international footballers
Serbia youth international footballers
Serbian SuperLiga players
Serbian First League players
Nemzeti Bajnokság I players
Red Star Belgrade footballers
RFK Grafičar Beograd players
Ferencvárosi TC footballers
FC DAC 1904 Dunajská Streda players
Slovak Super Liga players
Serbian expatriate footballers
Serbian expatriate sportspeople in Hungary
Expatriate footballers in Hungary
Serbian expatriate sportspeople in Slovakia
Expatriate footballers in Slovakia